The 2014–15 Women's FIH Hockey World League Round 1 was held from June to December 2014. A total of 31 teams competing in 7 events were part in this round of the tournament playing for 15 berths in the Round 2, played in February and March 2015.

Teams
Each national association member of the International Hockey Federation (FIH) had the opportunity to compete in the tournament. Teams ranked 21st and lower in the FIH World Rankings current at the time of seeking entries for the competition at early 2013 were allocated to one of the Round 1 events. The following 31 teams, shown with final pre-tournament rankings, competed in this round of the tournament.

 (29)
 (41)
 (21)
 (23)
 (37)
 (51)
 (59)
 (25)

 (47)
 (33)
 (43)
 (39)
 (34)
 (22)
 (30)

 (61)

 (28)
 (62)
 (60)
 (49)
 (53)

 (36)
 (27)
 (42)
 (24)

 (45)

The teams were split into regional tournaments. Asian teams played at Singapore, Africans played in Kenya, and Oceanians played in Fiji. European teams were split into Lithuania and Czech Republic. Caribbean teams played in Jamaica, and the remaining American teams played in Mexico.

Singapore
Singapore, 21–26 June 2014.

All times are Singapore Standard Time (UTC+08:00)

First round

Pool A

Pool B

Fifth to seventh place classification

Seventh place

Fifth and sixth place

First to fourth place classification

Semifinals

Third and fourth place

Final

Šiauliai
Šiauliai, Lithuania, 27–29 June 2014.

Pool
All times are Eastern European Summer Time (UTC+03:00)

Hradec Králové
Hradec Králové, Czech Republic, 5–7 September 2014.

Pool
All times are Central European Summer Time (UTC+02:00)

Nairobi
Nairobi, Kenya, 5–7 September 2014.

Pool
All times are East Africa Time (UTC+03:00)

Guadalajara
Guadalajara, Mexico, 11–14 September 2014.

Pool
All times are Central Daylight Time (UTC−06:00)

Kingston
Kingston, Jamaica, 30 September–5 October 2014.

Pool
All times are Eastern Standard Time (UTC−05:00)

Suva
Suva, Fiji, 6–11 December 2014.

Pool
All times are Fiji Summer Time (UTC+12:00)

References

External links
Official website (Singapore)
Official website (Siauliai)
Official website (Nairobi)
Official website (Hradec Králové)
Official website (Guadalajara)
Official website (Kingston)
Official website (Suva)

Round 1